Love Is in the Air is a 2013 French romantic comedy film directed by Alexandre Castagnetti.

Synopsis
Antoine and Julie find themselves by chance installed side by side in the plane which brings them back from New York to Paris where Julie is to marry Franck. The problem is her flying neighbor is none other than her ex, with whom she had a wonderful and chaotic affair a few years earlier. How will Antoine use these seven hours of flight to try to seduce her again? They relive their meeting, their love, their breakup, a pretext for so many extravagant, biting and romantic scenes that will make this trip the most moving of their lives.

Cast 
 Ludivine Sagnier as Julie
 Nicolas Bedos as Antoine
 Jonathan Cohen as Hugo
 Arnaud Ducret as Franck
 Brigitte Catillon as Claire
 Jackie Berroyer as Arthur
 Clémentine Célarié as Marie
 Michel Vuillermoz as Georges
 Odile Vuillemin as Antoine's former girl-friend
 Lila Salet as Stéphanie
 Ina Castagnetti as Aïssa
 Sophie-Charlotte Husson as Nina
 Jérôme Charvet as Jérôme
 Jean-Philippe Goudroye as Renat

Box office

The film performed poorly in the US, made $4,937 on its first weekend with a $8,425 total.

References

External links 
 

2013 films
2013 romantic comedy films
French romantic comedy films
Films set on airplanes
Films set in Paris
2010s French-language films
2010s French films